The women's triple jump event at the 2021 European Athletics Indoor Championships was held on 6 March at 12:05 (qualification) and 7 March at 17:20 (final) local time.

Medalists

Records

Results

Qualification
Qualification: Qualifying performance 14.10 (Q) or at least 8 best performers (q) advance to the Final.

Final

References

2021 European Athletics Indoor Championships
Triple jump at the European Athletics Indoor Championships
European